Henry Berengar (1136/7–1150), sometimes numbered Henry (VI), was the eldest legitimate son of Conrad III of Germany and his second wife, Gertrude von Sulzbach. He was named after his father's maternal grandfather, the Emperor Henry IV, and his mother's father, Count Berengar II of Sulzbach. He was groomed for the succession, but predeceased his father.

In 1139, Henry was betrothed to Sophia, daughter of King Béla II of Hungary. She moved to Germany to learn German language and court culture, but relations between Germany and Hungary cooled after the death of her father in 1141. The marriage was cancelled while Sophia was still residing in Germany. After several letters to her brother, King Géza II, she received permission to remain in the German monastery where she had been living. Conrad and Henry likewise approved.

Conrad had the princes elect Henry, then ten years old, as co-King of Germany at a diet in Regensburg on 13 March 1147, before Conrad left on the Second Crusade. Henry was anointed and crowned on Laetare Sunday (30 March) in Aachen. During his father's absence on crusade (June 1147–May 1149), he was placed under the tutorship of the powerful abbot Wibald and the notary Heinrich von Wiesenbach. For his services, Heinrich was raised to the rank of master (magister) or protonotary (protonotarius). Nine letters (eight in full) written by or for Henry survive from this period of his reign.

The young Henry was the winning general at the Battle of Flochberg (1150) against Welf VI and Welf VII. The military prowess of the young ruler was emphasised in letters (dated the week of 16–20 April 1150 at Würzburg) to the Byzantine emperor Manuel I and the empress Irene, Gertrude's sister, informing them of the victory. Henry died later that year and was buried at the monastery of Lorch.

Notes

Sources

1130s births
1150 deaths
12th-century Kings of the Romans
Henry
Year of birth unknown
12th-century people of the Holy Roman Empire
Heirs apparent who never acceded
Royalty and nobility who died as children